The Pyxicephalidae are a family of frogs currently found in sub-Saharan Africa. However, in the Eocene, the taxon Thaumastosaurus lived in Europe.

Classification
The Pyxicephalidae contain two subfamilies, with a total of 12 genera. This family was formerly considered part of the family Ranidae.

Family Pyxicephalidae
 Subfamily Cacosterninae Genus Amietia (16 species)
 Genus Anhydrophryne (3 species)
 Genus Arthroleptella (10 species) – moss frogs
 Genus Cacosternum (16 species)
 Genus Microbatrachella (monotypic) – micro frog
 Genus Natalobatrachus (monotypic)
 Genus Nothophryne (5 species) – mongrel frogs
 Genus Poyntonia (monotypic)
 Genus Strongylopus (10 species)
 Genus Tomopterna (16 species)
Subfamily Pyxicephalinae
 Genus Aubria (2 species) – Masako fishing frog, brown ball frog
 Genus Pyxicephalus (4 species) – African bull frogs, pixie frog
 Genus Thaumastosaurus (3 species) – Quercy Phosphorites, France, Eocene (extinct)

References

 
Amphibian families
Taxa named by Charles Lucien Bonaparte
Afrotropical realm fauna